Rekilaulu is a type of rhymed stanzaic folksong in Finland.  

This musical form was influenced by German, Swedish, and British traditions of ballads and broadsides.  The term rekilaulu may be a Finnish adaptation of the German terms Reigenlied or Reihenlied.

References

Finnish music